"Hunter Eats Hunter" is the second single from Chevelle's seventh studio album, La Gárgola. The song debuted on June 24, 2014.

Critical reception
Loudwire ranked it the tenth greatest Chevelle song.

Track listing

Charts

References

2014 songs
2014 singles
Chevelle (band) songs
Songs written by Pete Loeffler
Songs written by Sam Loeffler
Epic Records singles